Internet Archaeology is an academic journal and one of the first fully peer-reviewed electronic journals covering archaeology. It was established in 1996. The journal was part of the eLIb project's electronic journals. The journal is produced and hosted at the Department of Archaeology at the University of York and published by the Council for British Archaeology. The journal has won several awards for its creative exemplars of linked e-publications and archives.

The journal's first editor-in-chief (1996–1999) was Alan Vince. Since 1999 it is edited by Judith Winters.

Journal content makes use of the potential of internet publication to present archaeological research (excavation reports, methodology, analyses, applications of information technology) in ways that could not be achieved in print, such as searchable data sets, visualisations/virtual reality models, and interactive mapping. The journal's content is archived by the Archaeology Data Service.

History 
The journal was established in 1995 with funding from the Jisc's Electronic Libraries programme and initially explored a subscription model.  In September 2014, editor Winters announced that the publication had adopted an open access approach and that all past and future content would be freely available.

Abstracting and indexing 
The journal is abstracted and indexed in:

Archaeology Data Service Library
ERIH PLUS
International Bibliography of the Social Sciences
Scopus

Editors 
The following persons are or have been editor-in-chief:
Alan Vince (1996–1999)
Judith Winters (1999–present)

References

External links

Archaeology journals
Open access journals
Creative Commons Attribution-licensed journals
Publications established in 1996
English-language journals